Horsham is a constituency represented in the House of Commons of the UK Parliament, centred on the eponymous town in West Sussex, its former rural district and part of another rural district. Its Member of Parliament (MP) was Francis Maude between 1997 and 2015; since then it has been Jeremy Quin, both of the Conservative Party.

Boundaries and profile
1885–1918: The Sessional Divisions of Horsham, Midhurst, Petworth, the civil parish of Crawley.

1945–1950: The Urban Districts of Horsham, Shoreham-by-Sea, Southwick, the Rural Districts of Chanctonbury and Horsham.

1950–1974: The Urban District of Horsham, the Rural Districts of Horsham, Midhurst, Petworth.

1983–1997: The District of Horsham.

1997–2010: The District of Horsham wards of Billingshurst, Broadbridge Heath, Cowfold, Denne, Forest, Holbrook, Itchingfield and Shipley, Nuthurst, Riverside, Roffey North, Rudgwick, Rusper, Slinfold, Southwater, Trafalgar, Warnham, the District of Mid Sussex wards of Balcombe, Copthorne and Worth, Crawley Down, Slaugham, Turners Hill, the District of Chichester wards of Plaistow and Wisborough Green.

2010–present: The District of Horsham wards of Billingshurst and Shipley, Broadbridge Heath, Denne, Forest, Holbrook East, Holbrook West, Horsham Park, Itchingfield, Slinfold and Warnham, Nuthurst, Roffey North, Roffey South, Rudgwick, Rusper and Colgate, Southwater, and Trafalgar, and the District of Mid Sussex wards of Ardingly and Balcombe, Copthorne and Worth, and Crawley Down and Turners Hill.

The constituency is located in a northern part of West Sussex, bordering the constituencies of Arundel and South Downs, Mid Sussex. It is centred slightly east of the town of Horsham and is rectangular with the exception of a noticeable gap formed by the smaller constituency of Crawley.

The constituency (including its brief larger versions under other names) has been represented by members of the Conservative Party since 1880, making it the longest held Conservative seat and not normally with marginal majorities making it a safe seat, though just outside the top twenty Conservative seats sorted by majority.

History
Horsham has existed as a constituency for three distinct periods. It first sent members to Parliament in 1295. However, the constituency was abolished in 1918 to make way for Horsham and Worthing. In 1945 the constituency was recreated, until 1974 when Horsham and Crawley was created. In 1983 the constituency of Horsham was again created and has existed since.

Members of Parliament

MPs before 1660

MPs 1660–1832 

 Representation reduced to one (1832)

MPs 1832–1918

MPs 1945–1974

MPs since 1983

Elections

Elections in the 2010s

Elections in the 2000s

Elections in the 1990s

This constituency underwent boundary changes between the 1992 and 1997 general elections and thus change in share of vote is based on a notional calculation.

Elections in the 1980s

Elections in the 1970s

Elections in the 1960s

Elections in the 1950s

Elections in the 1940s

Elections in the 1910s

Elections in the 1900s

    = N/A

Elections in the 1890s

Elections in the 1880s

 Caused by Aubrey-Fletcher's appointment as a Groom in Waiting.

Elections in the 1870s

 Caused by the by-election being declared void on petition.

 Caused by Vesey-FitzGerald's appointment as Chief Charity Commissioner for England and Wales.

Elections in the 1860s

 Both candidates received the same number of votes, and both were declared elected, with petitions lodged against both. However, on 3 May 1869, Aldridge withdrew his claim to the seat allowing Hurst to be the sole MP.

Elections in the 1850s

Elections in the 1840s

 Held due to the 1847 general election result being declared void on petition, due to treating, on 23 March 1848. After a further petition arising from the by-election, Vesey-Fitzgerald was declared unduly elected, due to bribery and treating by both him and his agents, and Fitzalan-Howard was declared elected on 8 September 1848.

 Caused by Scarlett's succession to the peerage, becoming 2nd Baron Abinger

Elections in the 1830s

See also
List of parliamentary constituencies in West Sussex
Horsham

Notes

References

Sources
Election result, 2010 (BBC)
Election result, 2005 (BBC)
Election results, 1997 - 2001 (BBC)
Election results, 1997 - 2001 (Election Demon)
Election results, 1983 - 1992 (Election Demon)
Election results, 1992 - 2010 (Guardian)

Parliamentary constituencies in South East England
Constituencies of the Parliament of the United Kingdom established in 1295
Constituencies of the Parliament of the United Kingdom disestablished in 1918
Constituencies of the Parliament of the United Kingdom established in 1945
Constituencies of the Parliament of the United Kingdom disestablished in 1974
Constituencies of the Parliament of the United Kingdom established in 1983